Moron or Morón may refer to:

 Moron (psychology), disused term for a person with a mental age between 7 and 10

People
 Edgar Moron (born 1941), German politician
 Morón (surname), various people so named

Places
 Moron (ancient city), mentioned by the Greek geographer Strabo
 Morón, Buenos Aires, a city in Greater Buenos Aires, Argentina
 Roman Catholic Diocese of Morón, Argentina
 Morón Partido, a district in Buenos Aires Province
 Morón, Cuba, a city in Cuba
 Moron, Grand'Anse, a commune of Haiti
 Mörön, a town in Mongolia
 Mörön, Khentii, a district of Khentii Province in eastern Mongolia
 Morong, Bataan, a municipality in the Philippines formerly known as Moron
 Morón, Venezuela, a town in northern Venezuela
 Moron, later renamed Taft, California, a city
 Moron (mountain), in the Jura Mountains 
 Morón de la Frontera, also known as Morón, a municipality in Spain.
 Morón Air Base, in Morón de la Frontera, Spain
 Moron Lake, a lake in Alaska
 Lac de Moron, a lake on the border between France and Switzerland

Other uses
 Moron (bacteriophage), an extra gene in prophage genomes that do not have a phage function in the lysogenic cycle
 Moron (beetle), a genus of beetles in the family Cerambycidae
 Moron (Book of Mormon), a name and a location in the Book of Mormon
 Moron (food), a type of rice cake native in the Eastern Visayas, Philippines
 "Moron" (Sum 41 song)
 "Moron" (KMFDM song)

See also
 
 

 Moran (disambiguation)
 Morin (disambiguation)
 Morion (disambiguation)
 Maroon (disambiguation)